Patrick Lichty is a conceptual media artist, activist, curator, and educator. Lichty is currently a Creative Digital Media professor at Winona State University.

Artwork

RTMark/The Yes Men 
Lichty was part of the activist collective RTMark (pronounced "art-mark"). Lichty was also member of RTMark's successor group The Yes Men, and is featured in the collective's first documentary.

Digital Tapestry 
He is a creator of digital tapestries, especially Jacquard weaving, and is noted alongside Chuck Close as a seminal contemporary artist in this genre. In December 2014, he had a solo exhibition of his tapestry and robotic drawing work called "Sensible Concepts: Mediation as a Way of Being".

Virtual Reality, Second Life, Second Front 
He is a co-founder of Second Front, a pioneering Second Life performance art group.

Augmented Reality, Manifest.AR, Shared Universe 
Lichty was an associate member of the first Augmented Reality art collective, https://manifest-ar.art/.

New Media Curation 
Lichty is a noted New Media art curator, speaking at venues such as the Tate Modern, and is published in the book, New Media in the White Cube and Beyond: Curatorial Models for Digital Art, edited by Whitney Museum of American Art digital curator, Christiane Paul.

In December 2021, Lichty curated Through the Mesh: Media, Borders, and Firewalls at the NeMe Art Center in Limassol, Cyprus

Residencies, recognition, and awards
 Summer School: Curatorial Masterclass (with CRUMB) (2009) 
 Virginia Center for the Creative Arts Residency (2013)
 Herb Alpert Foundation/CalArts Fellowship (Film/Video - RTMark) 2002
 Eyebeam Artist in Residence 2009

Collections/Galleries 
Lichty's work is in collections of The Walker Art Center, Minneapolis, MN and the Smithsonian. He also works as a curator and critic.

Bibliography

References

External links

Artists from Ohio
Living people
Mass media theorists
New media artists
Internet art
Critical theorists
Bowling Green State University alumni
1962 births